Lilas Traïkia (borm 6 August 1985) is a French football forward currently playing in the Division 2 Féminine for FCF Val d'Orge. She played the UEFA Women's Cup in 2002 and 2003 with Toulouse FC. She made five appearances for the French national team between 2006 and 2008, scoring one goal against Serbia in the 2009 European Championship qualification.

References

External links
 
 

1985 births
Living people
French women's footballers
France women's international footballers
Toulouse FC (women) players
ASPTT Albi players
Paris FC (women) players
Women's association football forwards
Division 1 Féminine players